Francis Fitzpatrick VC (1859 – 10 July 1933), born in Tullycorbet, County Monaghan was an Irish recipient of the Victoria Cross, the highest and most prestigious award for gallantry in the face of the enemy that can be awarded to British and Commonwealth forces.

Military career
He was about 20 years old, and a Private in the 94th Regiment of Foot (later The Connaught Rangers), British Army during the campaign against Sekukuni when the following deed took place for which he was awarded the VC.

On 28 November 1879 during an attack on Sekukuni's Town, South Africa, Private Fitzpatrick and another private (Thomas Flawn) with six men of the Native Contingent, were with a lieutenant of the 1st Dragoon Guards when he was badly wounded. The natives carried the wounded officer at first, but when the party was pursued by about 30 of the enemy they deserted and the lieutenant would have been killed but for the gallantry of the two privates - one carrying him and the other covering the retreat and firing on the enemy.

Later life
Fitzpatrick died in Glasgow, Scotland, on 10 July 1933. He was buried at St Kentigern's Cemetery, Glasgow

The medal

His Victoria Cross is displayed at the National Army Museum (Chelsea, England).

References

Listed in order of publication year 
The Register of the Victoria Cross (1981, 1988 and 1997)

Ireland's VCs (Dept of Economic Development, 1995)
Monuments to Courage (David Harvey, 1999)
Irish Winners of the Victoria Cross (Richard Doherty & David Truesdale, 2000)

External links
Spink auction of his medals

Location of grave and VC medal (Glasgow)
 

1859 births
1933 deaths
Military personnel from County Monaghan
Burials in Scotland
Irish recipients of the Victoria Cross
Connaught Rangers soldiers
People from County Monaghan
People of the Sekukuni Campaign
Argyll and Sutherland Highlanders soldiers
British Army personnel of the Second Boer War
British Army recipients of the Victoria Cross